Epinotia solandriana is a moth of the family Tortricidae. It is found in Europe, China (Jilin, Heilongjiang, Shaanxi, Gansu, Qinghai provinces), Korea, Japan, and Russia.

Morphology 
The wingspan is 16–21 mm.The forewings are elongate and the costa moderately arched, the fold reaching 1/3. The ground colour varies from whitish ochreous or brownish to ferruginous. It may have dark fine streaks, sometimes whitish-mixed. The basal patch has an angulated edge, and the central fascia narrows towards its extremities. Both are sometimes darker. A rounded triangular white or pale median dorsal blotch is sometimes replaced by a more elongate semi-oval, dark reddish-brown blotch. The termen is rather oblique. The hindwings are light grey. The larva is grey-whitish or dull greenish ; head pale brown or partly black ; plate of 2 whitish or brown

Ecology 
The moth flies in one generation from July to September depending on the location.

The larvae mainly feed on birch (Betula species), hazel (Corylus avellana), and willow (Salix species)

References

External links
 Lepidoptera of Belgium
 Epinotia solandriana at UKmoths

Eucosmini
Moths of Asia
Tortricidae of Europe
Moths of Japan
Moths of Korea
Moths of Iceland
Moths described in 1758
Taxa named by Carl Linnaeus